Ingersheim is a commune in the Haut-Rhin department in Grand Est in north-eastern France. It is located near Colmar.

See also
 Communes of the Haut-Rhin département

References

Communes of Haut-Rhin